Wildwood Falls, also known as Row River Falls, is a waterfall located on the west skirt of the Umpqua National Forest, in Lane County, in the U.S. state of Oregon. It is located in a privileged area on the west foothills where Willamette National Forest meets with the Umpqua National Forest.

Trail 
Wildwood Falls totals  fall in a wide cascade and is the centerpiece attraction of the Wildwood Falls trailhead and Recreation Site. A foot trail loops out and back for a total of approximately  starting near Culp Creek, Oregon.

See also 
 List of waterfalls in Oregon

References 

Waterfalls of Lane County, Oregon
Parks in Lane County, Oregon